Alex Alberto Cano Ardila (born March 13, 1983) is a Colombian road racing cyclist, who is currently suspended from the sport, after a biological passport violation. He was named in the start list for the 2015 Vuelta a España.

Major results

2003
 3rd Overall Vuelta a Uraba
2006
 1st Coppa Penna 
 1st Stage 9 Girobio
2007
 1st Overall Giro della Valle d'Aosta
1st Mountains classification
1st Stages 3 & 6
 2nd Overall Giro delle Valli Cuneesi
1st Stage 4
 5th Trofeo Gianfranco Bianchin
 10th Giro del Belvedere
2008
 2nd Overall Clasica Marinilla 
1st Stage 3 
 10th Overall Clásico RCN
1st Stage 6 
2009
 1st Stage 4 Vuelta a Antioquia
 10th Prueba Villafranca de Ordizia
2010 
 7th Overall Vuelta a Asturias
 8th Overall Vuelta a Colombia
2012
 1st Overall Vuelta a Antioquia
 1st Stage 7 Vuelta Internacional de Higuito
 2nd Overall Clásico RCN
 6th Overall Vuelta Mexico Telmex
1st Mountains classification
1st Stages 4 & 7 (ITT)
 7th Overall Vuelta a Colombia
2013
 2nd Overall Vuelta a Colombia
2014
 1st  Overall Vuelta a Guatemala
1st Stages 3 & 4
 1st Stage 8 Clásico RCN
2015
 4th Overall Tour of Turkey
 9th Time trial, Pan American Games
2016
 3rd Overall Vuelta a Colombia
2017
 2nd Overall Vuelta a Colombia
1st Stages 5 & 8 (ITT)

Grand Tour general classification results timeline

Other major stage races

References

External links

1983 births
Living people
People from Yarumal
Colombian male cyclists
Cyclists at the 2015 Pan American Games
Pan American Games competitors for Colombia
Vuelta a Colombia stage winners
Sportspeople from Antioquia Department
20th-century Colombian people
21st-century Colombian people